Shounen Ninja Sasuke is an action-adventure game released by Sunsoft for the Super Nintendo Entertainment System in 1994. The game was supposed to be released in English as Boy Ninja Sasuke.

Gameplay

The game is very similar to Konami's Legend of the Mystical Ninja.

Plot

The young ninja Sasuke and his monk friend Chin-nan embark on a quest to rescue a princess kidnapped by an evil warlord.

Reception

On release, Famicom Tsūshin scored the game a 21 out of 40.

References

1994 video games
Action-adventure games
Japan-exclusive video games
Video games about ninja
Sunsoft games
Super Nintendo Entertainment System games
Super Nintendo Entertainment System-only games
Video games developed in Japan